El súper, also known as El súper: Historias de todos los días, is a Spanish soap opera. Aired from 1996 to 1999, it was the first daily television series produced in Spain broadcast at the national level.

Premise 
The fiction follows Julia (Natalia Millán), a woman working as a cashier in a supermarket. After Julia finds out she is a member of the Bernal family and thus the rightful heir to the supermarket chain she works in, she becomes the main foe of Alfonso Torres (Andrés Resino), a villain figure responsible for most of the crimes happening in the series.

Cast 
 Natalia Millán as Julia Ponce.
  as Alfonso Torres.
  as Maika Bernal.
 Lola Marceli as Mercedes.
 Manuel Navarro as Ernesto.
 Mónica Estarreado as Leticia
  as Agustín Rueda.
  as Mari Carmen.
 Chisco Amado as Santiago.
  as Miguel.
  as Carlos.
 Juncal Rivero as Verónica.
 Karla Sofía Gascón as Guillermo.
 Manuel Bandera

Production and release 
El súper was the first daily national television series produced in Spain. A regional daily series, the Catalan Poble Nou, predated the series. Filming started in August 1996 in a Tele 5 set located in Villaviciosa de Odón. Some prominent screenwriters such as Orestes Lara, Rodolf Sirera, Jaume Banacolocha, Virginia Yagüe, and Alonso Puerta were part of the scriptwriting team. Boris Izaguirre also worked as screenwriter. The series was a mash-up of elements from US soap operas (such as Falcon Crest), the thriller genre and the telenovela.

The first two seasons were produced by Zeppelin and Diagonal TV whereas the following two seasons were produced by Estudios Picasso.

Aired from 6 September 1996 to 31 December 1999, The broadcasting run comprised 4 seasons and 738 episodes, broadcast at late afternoon. The running time was 20–30 minutes. The series' main tune (initially an instrumental sax theme to which the vocals of Natalia Millán added in the second season) became very popular in Spain.

References 
Citations

Bibliography
 

1996 Spanish television series debuts
1999 Spanish television series endings
Television shows filmed in Spain
Telecinco telenovelas
Spanish television soap operas
1990s Spanish drama television series
Television series set in shops
Spanish thriller television series
Telecinco network series
Spanish-language television shows
Television series by Diagonal TV